Latina Airport  is a military airport located near Latina, a city in the Lazio region of central Italy. It is also known as Enrico Comani Airport, named after Enrico Comani, an Italian aviator.

The airport is home to the 70th Wing (70° Stormo) of Italian Air Force (Aeronautica Militare Italiana).

Facilities

References

External links
 

Italian airbases
Airport
Buildings and structures in the Province of Latina
Transport in Lazio